The ruisseau Weedon (in English: Weedon Stream) is a small steam which crosses the municipality of Weedon, in the Le Haut-Saint-François Regional County Municipality (MRC), in the administrative region of Estrie, in Quebec, in Canada.

Geography 

The neighboring hydrographic slopes of the Weedon River are:
 north side: Mud stream, Dufresne stream, rivière au Canard;
 east side: rivière au canard, Saint-François River;
 south side: Saint-François River;
 west side: outlet of Lac d'Argent, Nicolet River, Royer stream.

The Weedon River has its source at Lac Fer à Cheval.

From "Lac Fer à Cheval", the Weedon river flows over:
  eastward, skirting a mountain to the north (summit at  altitude), to the northwest shore of Vaseux lake, which the current crosses on  towards the southeast;
  to route 112;
  towards the south-east, crossing the village of Weedon, to a street;
  towards the south-east, to its mouth.

The Weedon river joins the Saint-François River almost at the same place as the Saumon River.

History 

The river was used for a long time to feed the old mill, located in the park of the Old Mill, which was at the center of the economy of the nascent municipality. The site of the mill is now a tourist attraction.

Toponymy 

The term "Weedon" refers to a town in England in Buckinghamshire. The name of the locality was borrowed from that of the river.

The toponym "ruisseau Weedon" was made official on December 5, 1968, at the Commission de toponymie du Québec.

See also 
 List of rivers of Quebec

References 

Rivers of Estrie
Le Haut-Saint-François Regional County Municipality